Local elections were held in Cambodia on 3 June 2012.

Results

References

Communal elections in Cambodia
2012 in Cambodia
Cambodia